Dobble is a game in which players have to find symbols in common between two cards. It was the UK’s best-selling game in 2018 and 2019.

The game is sold as Dobble in Europe and Spot It! in the US. The name is a play on the word 'double'.

Gameplay 
The game uses a deck of 55 cards, each printed with eight different symbols. Any two cards always share one, and only one, matching symbol. The objective of the game is to be the first player to announce the common symbol between two given cards.

Development 
In 1976, inspired by Kirkman's schoolgirl problem, French mathematics enthusiast Jacques Cottereau devised a game consisting of a set of 31 cards each with six images of insects, with exactly one image shared between each pair of them. In 2008, journalist and game designer Denis Blanchot found a few of the cards from the "game of insects" and developed the idea to create Dobble.

Dobble was released in France in 2009, and in the UK and North America in 2011 under Blue Orange Games. In 2015, the French board game company Asmodee acquired the rights to Dobble and Spot It!.

Mathematics 

The special way that symbols are arranged on Dobble cards can be understood using geometry. If each card is represented by a line, and each symbol by a point where two lines intersect, then the properties of Dobble are that:

 any two lines intersect at exactly one point, and
 any two points are joined by exactly one line.

This geometric structure is an example of a finite projective plane.

If there are 3 points in each line this creates a structure known as the Fano plane. This represents a simpler version of Dobble with 3 symbols on each card, 7 cards and 7 symbols.

In general, a finite projective plane with n points on each line has n2-n+1 points and lines.

To represent the real game of Dobble, each line must join 8 points. This results in a structure with 57 lines and 57 points (82-8+1=57), corresponding to 57 cards and 57 symbols. However, the game works fine with fewer cards too, and Dobble is marketed with 55 cards in the deck (but 57 different symbols). A junior version of Dobble is marketed with 6 symbols per card, 30 cards, and 31 different symbols (62-6+1=31).

External links 

 Puzzlewocky: Finite Projective Planes and the Math of Spot It!
 Mathematical Association of America: The Intersection Game
 Peter Collingridge - The Mathematics of Dobble
 How does Dobble (Spot It) work?

References 

Board games